Thurtle is a surname. Notable people with the surname include: 

Dorothy Thurtle (1890–1973), British women's right activist
Ernest Thurtle (1884–1954), British Labour politician